Water on the Brain is a 1933 comedy spy novel by the British writer Compton Mackenzie. Based on his own experiences working for British intelligence during the First World War, Mackenzie wrote a parody of the traditional spy novel. He had recently been prosecuted under the Official Secrets Act for divulging his wartime experience.

References

Bibliography
 Burton, Alan. Historical Dictionary of British Spy Fiction. Rowman & Littlefield, 2016.

1933 British novels
Novels by Compton Mackenzie
British comedy novels
British thriller novels
British spy novels
Novels set in London
Novels set in Scotland
Cassell (publisher) books